Graziano Battistini (12 May 1936 – 22 January 1994) was an Italian professional road bicycle racer. In 1960, Battistini won two stages in the Tour de France, and finished in second place in the general classification.

Major results

1959
Giro d'Italia:
7th place overall classification
1960
Coppa Sabatini
GP Saice
Tour de France:
Winner stages 7 and 16
2nd place overall classification
1962
Giro d'Italia:
Winner stage 2
Leading general classification for four days
8th place overall classification
1963
Giro d'Italia:
9th place overall classification
1965
Giro d'Italia:
Winner stage 20

External links 

Official Tour de France results for Graziano Battistini

Italian male cyclists
1936 births
1994 deaths
Italian Tour de France stage winners
Italian Giro d'Italia stage winners
Sportspeople from the Province of Massa-Carrara
Cyclists from Tuscany